Miss Universe Bangladesh is a national beauty contest that selects Bangladesh's representative in the Miss Universe contest.

History
Miss Universe Bangladesh launched officially on 7 September 2019. The crown of this competition was unveiled on 15 October 2019.The 2nd edition is to be held in March 20,2021. The winner will represent the country at Miss Universe 2020 Shirin Akter Shila became the first winner of this competition in 2019.

Titleholders

See also
Miss Bangladesh
Miss World Bangladesh
Miss Earth Bangladesh
Bangladesh at major beauty pageants

References

 
Beauty pageants in Bangladesh
Women in Bangladesh
Bangladeshi awards
2019 establishments in Bangladesh
Miss Universe by country
Competitions in Bangladesh